Pazzagli is an Italian surname. Notable people with the surname include:

Andrea Pazzagli (1960–2011), Italian footballer
Edoardo Pazzagli (born 1989), Italian footballer

Italian-language surnames